The Panasonic Lumix DMC-TZ10 is a compact "Travel Zoom" digital camera released in 2010. It is equipped with a 12x zoom lens, a GPS receiver for geotagging, has 12 Megapixels, and can film at up to 720p resolution at 30 frames per second in MJPEG and AVCHD formats. The camera can be connected to a USB port for file transfer and weighs 218 grams. 

In North America, the camera is referred to by model code DMC-ZS7.

Since initial release, Panasonic have published two firmware upgrades for the TZ10. Version 1.1 was released in June 2010, and improved stability on camera startup, and support for several external flashes. Firmware version 1.2 was released in September 2010, and improves GPS location retrieval time.

Description 
 12.1 megapixel
 Flash
 12x optical zoom Leica lens
 Objective focus length: 4.1~49.2 mm (35 mm equivalent: 25~300 mm)
 Objective aperture: f/3.3~4.9
 POWER O.I.S. automatic utilisation with processor Venus Engine HD II
 Intelligent Resolution Technology
 Automatic ISO control
 4x Digital Zoom lossless
 PASM modes
 AVCHD film type with HD resolution 720P (1280x720 / 30 fps) and Sound stereo dolby
 GPS module with 500,000 Point of Interest in the world
 3' screen 460,000 pixels
 Cards: SD, SDHC and SDXC

Examples

References

External links 

Superzoom cameras
TZ10
Leica Camera
Live-preview digital cameras